Théâtre Fairmount is a music venue in Montreal, Quebec, Canada located at 5240 Park Avenue in the Mile End district.

History
Théâtre Fairmount (or Fairmount Theatre) opened in March 2015 under the ownership of Neon Productions, a local promoter with over 15 years of experience with live shows. Previously the venue was known under the names Cabaret Mile-End, Kola Note  and was the location for the original Club Soda which operated from 1983 until 1999 when it moved to their present-day location in the Quartier des Spectacles on Saint Laurent Boulevard.

Over the years the room has seen the likes of Soundgarden, Oasis, Robert Palmer, Rufus Wainwright, The Go-Betweens, Ben Harper  and Fun. grace the stage, as well was known for week-long residencies by Quebec rock icons such as Michel Pagliaro.

References

External links
 
 

Theatres in Montreal
Music venues in Montreal
Le Plateau-Mont-Royal